WSGI (1100 AM) is a daytime-only radio station broadcasting a Full Christian Music format. It is licensed to Springfield, Tennessee, United States, and is owned by Eliu Maldonado, through licensee Eben-ezer Broadcasting Corporation, LLC.

For more info, visit website at www.wsgi1100.com.

References

External links
 

SGI
Robertson County, Tennessee
SGI